Lee Sang-woo (born February 13, 1980) is a South Korean actor. He rose to fame in the 2007 television drama First Wives' Club, and has since played leading roles on The Road Home (2009), Don't Hesitate (2009), Life Is Beautiful (2010), and Feast of the Gods (2012).

Career
Lee Sang-woo launched his acting career in 2005, starring in a Drama City episode and a minor role in the television drama 18 vs. 29. This was followed by more supporting roles on television, including his big screen debut in Almost Love, a romantic comedy film headlined by Kwon Sang-woo and Kim Ha-neul. During this time, he also starred as one of the three leading actors of the independent film Don't Look Back (2006), which was the closing film of that year's Jeonju International Film Festival, and won a critic's prize at the Locarno International Film Festival.

Lee began his rise to fame with a supporting role in First Wives' Club, a popular drama which aired from 2007 to 2008 with a peak viewership rating of 41.3%. For his performance, he received a New Star Award at the SBS Drama Awards.

It was not until 2009 that Lee was cast in his first mainstream leading role, in The Road Home, followed soon after by another daily drama Don't Hesitate. In the same year, he also appeared as one of the leading actors in Searching for the Elephant, an erotic-psychological thriller about three thirty-something men struggling with schizophrenia, sex addiction and infidelity.

In 2010, Lee starred with Song Chang-eui in Life Is Beautiful as a gay couple. The drama is one of the few Korean dramas about an openly gay couple in Korean society, which have conservative views on sexuality. Despite the controversy, the show was successful in the ratings, and Lee would later work again with renowned screenwriter Kim Soo-hyun on A Thousand Days' Promise (2011) and Childless Comfort (2012).

After a supporting role in Believe in Love (also known as My Love, My Family, 2011), Lee was once again cast in the leading role in Feast of the Gods (2012). He later won the Excellence Award, Actor in a Special Project Drama at the MBC Drama Awards for Feast of the Gods and his supporting role in the period drama Horse Doctor.

In 2013, Lee joined the ensemble cast of Goddess of Marriage, followed by the adultery drama One Warm Word. Unlike his previous calm and quiet roles, in 2014 he was cast as the leading man in Glorious Day, a peculiar character which Lee said he looked forward to playing since it most resembles his real-life personality.

Lee then starred in two weekend dramas, All About My Mom and Happy Home. He returned to prime-time television, starring in romantic comedy drama 20th Century Boy and Girl.

In 2018, Lee was cast in the KBS2 weekend drama Marry Me Now as a doctor and was partnered with Han Ji-hye.

In 2019, Lee starred in the legal romantic comedy drama Touch Your Heart as an elite prosecutor. In the same year, Lee made a special appearance in the KBS drama Mother of Mine.  Lee later appeared in the MBC drama The Golden Garden.

In 2020, Lee made a special appearance in the drama. Lovestruck in the City 

In 2021, Lee made a special appearance in the SBS drama The Penthouse: War in Life 2. Later, Lee participated in the variety golf show King of Golf aired on TV Chosun along with Yang Se-hyung, Lee Dong-gook, and Jang Min-ho, and Lee was confirmed to participate in the TV Chosun  drama  Uncle.

Personal life
Lee married actress Kim So-yeon in June 2017. Their romantic relationship started in 2016. The pair met on the set of MBC's weekend drama Happy Home.

Filmography

Film

Television series

Web series

Television shows

Music video

Awards and nominations

References

External links
 Lee Sang-woo at HM Entertainment

Male actors from Seoul
South Korean male film actors
South Korean male television actors
1980 births
Living people
South Korean male models
21st-century South Korean male actors
Korea University alumni